This is a list of fictional depictions of Miyamoto Musashi, the famous 17th-century Japanese swordsman.

Film, television and theatre
There have been several dozen films and several television series with Miyamoto Musashi in the title, e g:

Films:
 Miyamoto Musashi (1929), directed by Kintaro Inoue.
 Miyamoto Musashi chi no maki (1937), directed by Takizawa Eisuke.
 Miyamoto Musashi (1938), directed by Kazuo Mori.
 Miyamoto Musashi chi no maki (1938), directed by Ishihashi Seiichi.
 Miyamoto Musashi ketto Hannyazaka (1943), directed by Daisuke Ito.
 Miyamoto Musashi: Kongoin no ketto (1943), directed by Daisuke Ito.
 Miyamoto Musashi: Nito-ryu kaigen (1943), directed by Daisuke Ito. Miyamoto Musashi (1944), directed by Kenji Mizoguchi.
 Miyamoto Musashi (1954), directed by Yasuo Kohata.
 Samurai I : Musashi Miyamoto (1954), directed by Hiroshi Inagaki (Part I of the Samurai Trilogy, starring Toshiro Mifune as Musashi).
 Samurai II: Duel at Ichijoji Temple Zoku Miyamoto Musashi: Ichijoji no ketto (1955), directed by Hiroshi Inagaki (Part II of the Samurai Trilogy, starring Toshiro Mifune as Musashi).
 Samurai III: Duel at Ganryu Island Miyamoto Musashi kanketsu-hen: ketto Ganryujima (1955), directed by Hiroshi Inagaki (Part III of the Samurai Trilogy, starring Toshiro Mifune as Musashi).
 Miyamoto Musashi shonen (1956), directed by Tatsuo Sakai.
 Miyamoto Musashi (1961 film), 5-part, 10-hour film directed by Tomu Uchida and all starring Nakamura Kinnosuke.
 Miyamoto Musashi: Swords of Death (1971), directed by Tomu Uchida.
 Miyamoto Musashi: Sword of Fury (1973), directed by Tai Kato.
 Miyamoto appears as a character, alongside Jubei Yagyu, in Kinji Fukasaku's Samurai Reincarnation.
 Ganryujima: Kojiro and Musashi (1992), directed by Yuji Murakami
 Musashi makes an appearance in Ryuhei Kitamura's film Aragami as the titular god of battle. He is portrayed as a godlike entity with a degree of immortality.
 Musashi is mentioned in the narration of the 2009 neo-noir film The Perfect Sleep.
 Samurai (2010), documentary on the samurai and Miyamoto Musashi featuring Mark Dacascos.
 Crazy Samurai Musashi (2020), directed by Yūji Shimomura and starring Tak Sakaguchi as Musashi MiyamotoTelevision:
 Sorekara no Musashi (1964-65 TV series). Musashi was played by Ryunosuke Tsukigata.
 Sorekara no Musashi (1981 TV series). Musashi was played by Nakamura Kinnosuke.  This series was distributed with English subtitles as Miyamoto Musashi, and follows part of Musashi's life leading up to the legendary duel with Sasaki Kojirō.  The final episode "breaks the fourth wall" with an historical presentation on Musashi and the duel.
 Sorekara no Musashi (1996 TV series). Musashi was played by Kinya Kitaoji.
The 42nd NHK taiga drama 武蔵 MUSASHI (2003) is based largely on the Yoshikawa novel and features kabuki actor Ichikawa Ebizō XI in the title role. 
 Miyamoto Musashi makes a short appearance in the 2009 Korean TV drama Return of Iljimae in episode 7. Musashi was played by Hwang Jang Lee.
 Musashi (2003), directed by Ozaki Mitsunobu. It stars Kabuki actor Ichikawa Shinnosuke (currently Ichikawa Ebizō XI).
 Miyamoto Musashi (2014), directed by Sasaki Akimitsu, Fujio Takashi and stars Kamikawa Takaya.
 Miyamoto Musashi (2014), Two-Part TV Series stars Takuya Kimura, Ikki Sawamura and directed by Ryôsuke Kanesaki .
 A “host” of Musashi is seen in two episodes of the second season of the US TV series Westworld (2018) where he resides in part of the theme park called Shogun World.Theatre:
 "Musashi" (2010), written by Hisashi Inoue, directed by Yukio Ninagawa.

Print
 Eiji Yoshikawa's famous novel Musashi (originally serialized in Asahi Shimbun prior to World War II) is more or less based on historical events with added fictitious characters. Yoshikawa's book was termed the "Gone with the Wind of Japan" by translator, Japan expert and former ambassador Edwin O. Reischauer in the foreword to the book.
 The manga series Vagabond is loosely based on Eiji's famous novel, in which Miyamoto Musashi is the main character, noted as a 'blood-lustful beast' throughout the series' beginning. After confronting Yagyu Sekishusai and personally contemplating that he had "felt the way", Musashi became more mature in the art of the sword, vowing to become the greatest swordsman under the sun.
 The Necromancer, the fourth installment in Michael Scott's The Secrets of the Immortal Nicholas Flamel series, refers to Niten. Perenelle Flamel states that "he is undoubtedly the greatest swordsman in the world—the only humani ever to defeat Scathach in single combat. But if you ask him what he is, he will tell you that he is an artist. And that is true: his skill with the brush is legendary. [...] Niten has traveled this world and the nearby Shadowrealms in search of opponents to fight simply to hone his skills. He was supposed to have been made immortal sometime in the seventeenth century by Benzaiten, who many—including the Witch—believe may even be one of the ancient Great Elders. Niten was also known as Miyamoto Musashi."
 Sorekara no Musashi (Further Tales of Musashi), a novel by Katsukiro Kouyama. It has been made into several television specials over the years, one of which featured Kinnosuke Nakamura.
 In Robert Jordan's book The Dragon Reborn, several references are made to a man named Jearom, the greatest swordsman of all. His only loss was to a farmer wielding a quarterstaff, probably a reference to Musashi's fight with Gonnosuke in Yoshikawa's novel.
 Manga artist Go Nagai gave the name Musashi to one of the pilots on his giant robot mecha creation, Getter Robo. He always carried a sword.
 The comic book Usagi Yojimbo has as its central character a rabbit samurai who is inspired by Musashi.
 In Steve Perry's Matador book series, and his novel The Musashi Flex, the "Musashi Flex" is an illegal underground martial arts competition, named after Musashi.
 Musashi was the subject of Sword of the Samurai by Michael Reeves and Steve Perry from the Time Machine interactive book series.
 In the book The Ninja by Eric van Lustbader there are several references to Musashi and The Book of Five Rings.
 In Chris Bradford's Young Samurai series, Miyamoto Musashi was the basis for legendary samurai character Masamoto Takeshi.
 In the novel The Blade of the Courtesans by Keiichiro Ryu, Musashi saved a baby named Matsunaga Seiichiro who is the imperial prince of Japan. As the boy grew up, he mentored him and taught him Niten Ichi-ryu in the mountains of Higo. When Seiichiro turned 26 years old, he was sent by Musashi to Edo to find Shoji Jin'emon in Yoshiwara.
 In February 2013, Musashi appears in the Image comics series Five Ghosts, written by Frank J. Barbiere with art by Chris Mooneyham. Musashi appears as a spirit who gives his skills to treasure hunter Fabian Gray. Musashi gives his skills along with four other spirits of unique talents, among them Merlin, Robin Hood, Sherlock Holmes and Count Dracula.
 David Kirk's novels Child of Vengeance (2013) and Sword of Honor (2015) are based on mostly historical events intertwined with legends about Musashi. The novels follow Musashi, a sickly and weak boy with eczema, who is not considered worthy by his father, Munisai. As he grows up, he receives training under his uncle Dorinbo in Buddhism and reading and writing, and later in the sword under his father Munisai. Musashi is described in the novels as an extremely tall man who has the advantage of reach and strength, who uses his environment and unconventional tactics to defeat multiple swordsmen at once. After taking part in the Battle of Sekigahara, Musashi abandons the ways of the samurai and develops a hatred for all samurai, deciding to go ronin. During his time as a masterless samurai, he is pursued by an adept swordsman, Akiyama, from the Yoshioka school, and later by the head of the Yoshioka school, Denshichiro.
 In 2013, Hideki Mori published Shishi, a manga based on the life of Miyamoto Musashi.

Manga and anime
 Karakuri Kengō Den Musashi Lord, starred Musashi (a "gimmick robot"). He battles and meets his rival, Kojiro (a reference to the historical battle between Miyamoto Musashi and Sasaki Kojirō).
 Musashi is named by Hydra in episode 9 of UFO Princess Valkyrie 2nd season.
 Musashi, the female member of the recurring Team Rocket trio in Pokémon was named after Miyamoto (in English, she is known as Jessica or "Jessie"). Her partner is called Kojiro (James in the English version). The name of her mother, who only appeared in an audio drama, was Miyamoto.
 Musashi appears in the first seven episodes of the anime Shura no Toki – Age of Chaos, duelling against a martial artist where, after a stalemate, he supposedly stops fighting because he was fighting against the perfect match to his skills. His adopted son appears in the next couple of episodes, but without any involvement from Musashi himself.
 The two main male characters in the Japanese television drama Bus Stop are named Miyamae Musashi and Sasajima Kojiro. In one episode, the main female character remarks that she is like the island where Musashi and Kojiro held their duel.
 In the anime Yaiba, Musashi appears as an old man, still alive after 400 years, living as a hermit. Later on, Kojiro is resurrected by Onimaru to fight for him. He confronts Musashi again when he comes to visit Kojiro's grave.
 In the episode "Generous Elegy (Part 2) – Elegy of Entrapment (Verse 2)" of the anime Samurai Champloo, an old man saves Jin from drowning after an assassin's ambush. Appearing almost insane at times, he talks to Jin about fishing – giving him, almost by accident, an important clue as to how he can defeat his enemy. When Jin later asks him his name, the old man claims to be Miyamoto Musashi before cracking up and dismissing the claim.
 In the anime Ninja Resurrection, Miyamoto Musashi makes a brief appearance fighting the main character, Jubei. It is never clearly shown whether Musashi loses this duel, however, only that he retired to the life of a hermit around the year 1640.
 Musashi is briefly quoted in Cowboy Bebop. At the end of episode 22 titled "Cowboy Funk", Spike's rival Andy rides off into the sunset, claiming to have changed his name to Musashi.
 The main character in the anime Musashi Gundoh is Miyamoto Musashi, who is loosely based on the historical Musashi.
 In one episode of Ranma ½, Tatewaki Kuno is possessed by an old bokuto that was wielded by Musashi in his duel with Kojiro. While under its control, he believed himself to be Musashi and would disappear during the day and wander the halls of Furinkan High School at night, looking for a powerful opponent. It was destroyed by a lightning bolt after Kuno was kicked skyward by Akane, whom he had mistaken for his long-lost love.
 In episode 55 of Rumiko Takahashi'''s Urusei Yatsura, Ataru's teacher was portrayed as Musashi setting out on a quest to become famous while Ataru's rival Mendou was portrayed as Musashi's rival Sasaki Kojiro.
 Kurz Weber briefly refers to Musashi Miyamoto in the anime series Full Metal Panic in episode 13, "A Cat and a Kitten's Rock and Roll". When Teletha Testarossa is late for an Arm Slave battle with Melissa Mao. When Melissa gets impatient and frustrated, Kurz briefly asks her if she's heard of Musashi Miyamoto.
 In Dr. Slump, Arale, Gatchan, and Taro used the time slipper to go to the day of his dual with Kojiro. Arale questions his power, so they spend two days playing Rochambeau to see who is stronger. Musashi is amazed later on, and goes with her to the present, attending her school, while Kojiro spends the rest of his days waiting for him.
 In Shaman King, Yoh Asakura's spirit partner Amidamaru is possibly based on Musashi.
 In the anime and manga Shugo Chara!, Kairi Sanjou's idol is Musashi Miyamoto, and thus his Guardian Character was born out of it. He character is also called Musashi.
 Production I.G announced it was making an anime based on the life of Musashi, scheduled for release in 2009.
 The Eyeshield 21 character Gen Takekura is nicknamed "Musashi", and his biggest rival's name is Sasaki.
 In Yu Yu Hakusho, Kuwabara fights against a swordsman named Musashi during the Genki tournament arc.
 In Mutsu Enmei Ryuu Gaiden: Shura No Tok, Musashi makes several appearances in the chronicle of Mutsu Yakumo. This culminates in a one-on-one battle between Musashi and the main character. Although Musashi is clearly beaten, Yakumo declares it a draw because he briefly made use of his sword to block an attack.
 In Flint the Time Detective, Musashi makes an appearance, befriending a Time Shifter by the name of Shadow.
 In the manga Amakusa 1637, there is no real Miyamoto Musashi. A young man from modern Japan named Masaki Miyamoto, however, is thrown into the Shimabara Rebellion without memories of his past, and is named "Miyamoto Musashi" by Otsu, a girl whom he befriends after she saves him.  He then gradually remembers his past and joins the heroes, also time travelers who used to be his friends before being brought to the past.
 Miyamoto Musashi is the central character in the fourth main series of the Baki Dou manga. The story depicts him being revived into modern-day age through a combination of science and occultism and revolves around the Baki Dou cast trying to challenge his awesome swordsmanship.
 In the manga One Piece, one of the main characters, Roronoa Zoro, the swordsman of the Straw Hat Pirates, is loosely based on Miyamoto Musashi who is also an outstanding all around swordsman. Another character, Kozuki Oden, who is hailed as the strongest samurai of his lifetime, is also based on Miyamoto Musashi. Oden was an immensely skilled and powerful swordsman who developed his own variation of Nitoryu. Oden was specialized in the style of two swords, just like Miyamoto Musashi, and his legendary dual wielding swordsmanship allowed him to scar even an Oni.
In Shinobu Ohtaka's manga, Orient, the main protagonist, also named Musashi, is inspired by Miyamoto Musashi.
Ōganosuke Yogi is one of the most powerful characters in Kenichi the strongest disciple is based on Miyamoto Musashi. Same weapons and similar style and appearance.
Miyamoto Musashi is a legendary Japanese swordsman who fights with two blades and has an undefeated record of 61 duels. He is one of the human representatives in Record of Ragnarok, a manga series about a tournament between gods and humans.

Video gamesMusashi no Bōken, a Family Computer game released in 1990
 The character Haohmaru, from SNK's Samurai Shodown series, is loosely based on Musashi. Likewise, Tachibana Ukyo, also from Samurai Shodown, is based on Sasaki Kojiro.
 The Neo Geo game Musashi Ganryuki (known outside Japan as Ganryu) was based on Musashi's fight with Sasaki Ganryu Kojiro.
 The character Yasuo from League of Legends is vaguely based on Musashi.
 The PlayStation game Brave Fencer Musashi and its PlayStation 2 sequel Musashi: Samurai Legend are loosely based on Musashi. While Musashi used two swords and had a rival named Kojiro in the first game, and a nemesis named Gandrake (also based on Kojiro) in the second game, the plot of both games involve Musashi and his rival getting sent to an alternate world and bear no relation to the traditional story. In the first game, Musashi must collect the Five Scrolls of Fire, Earth, Water, Wind, and Sky and obtain the sword Lumina to seal away an evil entity known as the Wizard of Darkness. Midway through the story, Musashi eventually duels Kojiro in a location called Dragon Island, similar to their real world encounter at Funajima. Similarly in the second game, Musashi must obtain 5 legendary swords of Earth, Water, Fire, Wind, and Void. The concept of collecting five elemental objects vaguely represent the Five Rings. The main secondary weapon used during the second game, called the "Great Oar", is a take on the sword the real Musashi had created from an oar. Musashi uses this oar in addition to the swords he previously obtains to fight Gandrake in a final showdown to return to his world.
 In Live A Live, Ode Iou resurrects Musashi and uses him to distract Oboromaru.
 Onimusha Blade Warriors features both Sasaki Kojiro and Miyamoto Musashi as bonus characters.
 Miyamoto Musashi is a playable character in Koei's Samurai Warriors 2 and Warriors Orochi. The player can fight alongside, and later on, against Musashi at the "Swordsman" story of Samurai Warriors: Katana (noting that each of the title chapters in this story are based on The Book of Five Rings, replacing the fifth chapter title to be called "Sky"). In complement to this, Sasaki Kojiro was added as a playable character in Xtreme Legends, the expansion to Samurai Warriors. Both Musashi and Kojiro were cut from the character roster in Samurai Warriors 3. The dueling Samurai are expected to return for the series' 10th Anniversary 4th installment, Samurai Warriors 4.
 The character Heishiro Mitsurugi, from Namco's Soul series, is based on Musashi. Coincidentally, Haohmaru (also based on Musashi) appears alongside the former in Soulcalibur VI as a playable guest character.
 The legendary swordsman Frandar Hunding of The Elder Scrolls universe is heavily based on Musashi. Hunding wrote a book called the Book of Circles, a strong parallel to Musashi's The Book of Five Rings.
 In Sengoku Basara 2, Capcom's sequel to Sengoku Basara, Musashi is a playable character wielding a wooden sword and a boat oar as weapons.
 The character Musashi, from SNK's The Last Blade, is based on Miyamoto Musashi.
 Miyamoto Musashi is a playable character in the Warcraft III map Tides of Blood.
 Miyamoto Musashi appears as a main character in the PlayStation 3 epic action adventure Ryu ga Gotoku Kenzan!. He uses the two sword technique and his biggest rival is Sasaki Kojiro.
 Musashi is a playable character of the samurai class in the original Shining Force.
 In Time Killers, character Musashi is supposedly based on Miyamoto Musashi.
 In Teenage Mutant Ninja Turtles 2003 video game, when the player loses in the second Dojo stage with Donatello, Splinter quotes Miyamoto Musashi.
 Musashi also appears as a bonus boss character in Soul of the Samurai if played as Kotaro Hiba. Beating him will allow to dual wield two katana in his style.
 Musashi was released as a female Saber-servant for Fate/Grand Orders New Year's 2017 Gacha, and stars in its second part main storyline with the headline "Epic of Remnant". A male version of Musashi also appears, serving as the faceless narrator of the story.
 The character Jetstream Sam from Metal Gear Rising: Revengeance is based on Miyamoto Musashi

Music
 On the critically acclaimed 1983 album Piece of Mind'', British heavy metal band Iron Maiden gives a brief glimpse of Musashi in "Sun and Steel".
 John Zorn's Ganryu Island (1984 Tzadik release tz7319) depicts the famous duel between Musashi and Kojiro.
 Drum and bass producer Photek recorded a song called "Ni Ten Ichi Ryu". The video features a samurai who fights using a similar technique as Musashi.

References